Mark Joseph Green (born March 15, 1945) is an American author, former public official, public interest lawyer, and Democratic politician from New York City. Green was New York City Consumer Affairs Commissioner from 1990 to 1993 and New York City Public Advocate from 1994 to 2002. 

Green won Democratic primaries for the U.S. House of Representatives, U.S. Senate, and mayor of New York City, in each case losing the general election.

Early life and education
Green was born to a Jewish family in Brooklyn, New York. He lived in Bensonhurst, Brooklyn, until he was three and then moved to Long Island, first to Elmont, New York, and later Great Neck, New York. Both his parents were Republicans; his father was a lawyer and residential apartment landlord and his mother a public-school teacher.

Green graduated from Great Neck South High School in 1963, from Cornell University in 1967 and in 1970 from Harvard Law School, where he was editor-in-chief of the Harvard Civil Rights-Civil Liberties Law Review. He has a brother, realtor Stephen L. Green, founder of SLGreen Realty Corp.

Political career

1960s–1970s
 
In 1967, Green interned for Jacob Javits, and while in law school in the early 1970s, was a "Nader's Raider" at Ralph Nader's Public Citizen, where he worked on a lawsuit against the Richard Nixon administration after the firing of Watergate special prosecutor Archibald Cox. After law school, Green returned to Washington D.C. and ran the Congress Watch division of the consumer rights advocacy group Public Citizen from 1977 to 1980. In 1976, he managed former U. S. Attorney General Ramsey Clark's campaign for the Senate seat of James Buckley. Clark came in third, behind Ambassador Daniel Patrick Moynihan and Representative Bella Abzug. Moynihan went on to win the office and serve four terms in the Senate.

1980s
In 1980, Green returned to New York City and won the Democratic primary election to represent the East Side of Manhattan in the House of Representatives; he lost the race to Republican incumbent Bill Green (no relation). In 1981, Green and songwriter Harry Chapin founded the New Democracy Project, a public policy institute in New York City. Green ran it for a decade. During the 1984 presidential election, he served as chief speechwriter for Democratic candidate Senator Gary Hart, who ran second in the primaries.

In 1986, Green won the Democratic nomination for the Senate against multimillionaire John Dyson, spending just $800,000 to Dyson's $6,000,000. Dyson remained on the ballot as the candidate of the Liberal Party. Green lost the general election to Republican incumbent Alfonse D'Amato, who was supported by then mayor Ed Koch; Green filed a formal ethics complaint in the Senate Ethics Committee against D'Amato that resulted in D'Amato's being reprimanded by the Senate after media reports that suggested that his nomination as a chair of the Senate Committee of Banking, Housing, and Urban Affairs had been tainted by illegal financing of his Senate campaign.

During his Senate campaign, Green refused to accept money from special interest groups' political action committees (PACs) – which had accounted for 25% of all campaign spending in Congressional campaigns in 1984 – denouncing PACs as "legalized bribery." His opinion mirrored the stance of Common Cause, the citizens' lobby that organized to abolish PACs over fears of "special interests" buying votes.

1990s

In 1990, Mayor David Dinkins appointed Green Consumer Affairs Commissioner of New York City. Green was elected as the first New York City Public Advocate in 1993 and reelected in 1997. In that office, he led investigations of HMOs, hospitals, and nursing homes that led to fines by the New York State Attorney General.

A 1994 investigation on the Bell Regulations ("Libby Zion Law") to limit resident working hours and requiring physician supervision and a follow-up study prompted the New York State Department of Health to crack down on hospitals. Green led an effort against tobacco advertising aimed at children, enacting a law banning cigarette vending machines, and released a series of exposés and legal actions against tobacco advertising targeting children—concluding that R. J. Reynolds Tobacco Company was engaged in "commercial child abuse"—that culminated in a 1997 Federal Trade Commission decision that ended the Joe Camel ads.

As public advocate, Green first proposed the 311 complaint help line that Mayor Mike Bloomberg later implemented. He wrote laws that matched small donations with multiple city funds, created the Voter Commission, upheld the legality of the Independent Budget Office, barred stores from charging women more than men for the same services, and prohibited companies from firing female employees merely because they were victims of domestic violence. He started the city's first web site, NYC.gov, which he later gifted to City Hall, where it is still in use.

One of Green's highest-profile accomplishments was a lawsuit to obtain information about racial profiling in Rudy Giuliani's police force. As Green told the Gotham Gazette, "We sued Mayor Giuliani because he was in deep denial about racial profiling. [After winning the case, we] released an investigation showing a pattern of unpunished misconduct ... [and] the rate that police with substantiated complaints are punished went from 25 percent to 75 percent." Green was reportedly one of the first public officials to draw attention to racial profiling by the NYPD.

Green ran for the U.S. Senate again in 1998, when D'Amato was seeking a fourth term. Green finished third in the Democratic primary behind the winner, U.S. Representative Charles Schumer, and 1984 Democratic vice presidential nominee Geraldine Ferraro. Despite Green's personal ties to Nader, he did not support Nader's presidential campaigns.

In the 2000 campaign, Green praised Nader's work as a consumer advocate but endorsed Democratic nominee Al Gore, who narrowly lost the election to George W. Bush. In 2000, he assisted the successful Senate campaign of First Lady Hillary Clinton, coining the phrase "Listening Tour" to help guide Clinton through a state she hadn't previously lived in. In 2004, Green co-chaired Senator John Kerry's presidential campaign in New York; he also advised Bill Clinton in his successful 1992 New York presidential primary.

2001 campaign for mayor

 
In 2001 Green ran for mayor of New York City and won the Democratic nomination but lost to Republican nominee Michael Bloomberg 50%–48% in the closest NYC mayoral election in a century. Green narrowly defeated Fernando Ferrer in the primary, surviving a negative contest that divided the party. The two other candidates were Council Speaker Peter Vallone and City Comptroller Alan Hevesi.

The September 11, 2001 terrorist attacks occurred on the morning of the Democratic primary and contributed to Green's loss. Bloomberg spent an unprecedented $74 million on his campaign, especially on TV ads and direct mail. Mayor Rudy Giuliani, who was suddenly extremely popular, endorsed Bloomberg.

The Economist wrote, "The billionaire businessman [Bloomberg] is usually seen as one of the post–September 11th winners (if such a word can be so used): he would probably have lost the mayoralty to Mark Green, a leftish Democrat, had the terrorist strike not happened. Yet it is also worth noting that his election probably spared New York City a turbulent period of score-settling over Rudy Giuliani's legacy." Chris Smith wrote in New York Magazine in 2011, "Many old-school Democrats believe that Bloomberg's 2001 victory over Mark Green was a terrorist-provoked, money-soaked aberration."

The Ferrer campaign criticized Green for the actions of supporters in the runoff that were construed as racist, involving literature with New York Post caricatures of Ferrer and Al Sharpton distributed in white enclaves of Brooklyn and Staten Island. Green said he had nothing to do with the dissemination of the literature. An investigation by the district attorney of Kings County, New York, Charles J. Hynes, came to the conclusion that "Mark Green had no knowledge of these events, and that when he learned of them, he repeatedly denounced the distribution of this literature and sought to find out who had engaged in it."

The incident kept Ferrer from endorsing Green and is thought to have diminished minority turnout in the general election, which helped Bloomberg win in an overwhelmingly Democratic city. Green wrote an article about the campaign a decade later in the 9/11 anniversary issue of New York Magazine. He reported that Bloomberg told him in 2002 that "I wouldn't have won" without Ferrer's late campaign opposition to Green.

2006 campaign for New York attorney general

Green ran in the Democratic primary for New York State Attorney General in 2006. He faced former HUD Secretary Andrew Cuomo, former White House Staff Secretary Sean Patrick Maloney, and former lieutenant governor candidate Charles King in the primary. Green did not receive the required 25% at the state Democratic convention to earn a spot on the primary ballot and therefore had to circulate nominating petitions statewide to be on the September ballot.

He was required to submit at least 15,000 valid signatures; on July 13, he submitted more than 40,000 signatures. He held several endorsements of note, including former NYC Mayor David Dinkins, Brooklyn Borough President Marty Markowitz, the Sierra Club, the National Organization for Women (NOW), the New York Times, and the New York Daily News.

On September 12, 2006, Green lost to Andrew Cuomo in his bid to secure the Democratic nomination to succeed then-Attorney General Eliot Spitzer. On the evening the results came in, he vowed to reporters that "I won't be running for office again. But I'll continue to advocate, write and teach." Cuomo beat the Republican candidate, former Westchester County District Attorney Jeanine Pirro.

2009 campaign for public advocate

On February 10, 2009, Green announced that he would again run for the office of Public Advocate. His policy director was Benjamin Kallos (who later was elected to the New York City Council), with whom he worked on "100 Ideas for a Better City".

As one of the top two finishers in the Democratic primary, Green qualified for the September 29 runoff, but lost to City Councilmember Bill de Blasio who went on to win the mayoralty in 2013.

State and city campaign tickets
Mark J. Green has appeared on these slates:
1986 New York state Democratic ticket
Governor:  Mario Cuomo
Lieutenant Governor:  Stan Lundine
Comptroller:  Herman Badillo
Attorney General:  Robert Abrams
U.S. Senate:  Mark J. Green
1993 New York City Democratic ticket
Mayor: David Dinkins
Public Advocate:  Mark J. Green
Comptroller: Alan Hevesi
1997 New York City Democratic ticket
Mayor: Ruth Messinger
Public Advocate:  Mark J. Green
Comptroller: Alan Hevesi
2001 New York City Democratic ticket
Mayor: Mark J. Green
Public Advocate: Betsy Gotbaum
Comptroller: William Thompson

Television and radio
He was a regular guest on Crossfire on CNN, and also on William F. Buckley's Firing Line, Inside City Hall on NY1, and Hardball with Chris Matthews on MSNBC.

On March 6, 2007, Green's brother, New York real estate magnate Stephen L. Green, purchased majority shares in Air America Radio.  Stephen served as chairman, and Mark as president. Stephen sold Air America Radio in 2009 to Charles Kireker. Mark continued as president.

Green was co-host, with Arianna Huffington, of the syndicated talk show 7 Days in America, which aired on the network. from 2007–2009. He was the host of Both Sides Now, nationally syndicated on 200 stations and recorded at WOR710 AM in New York City; the program ended in December 2016.

On February 27, 2017, Green founded and ran the Twitter handle @ShadowingTrump [see ShadowingTrump.org]"to daily debunk Trump and propose progressive alternatives." His "Shadow Cabinet" of 21 included such national progressive leaders as Laurence Tribe as attorney general, Robert Reich as secretary of labor, Diane Ravitch as Education Secretary, Rashad Robinson as "Secretary of Justice Issues, Marielena Hincapie of the National Immigration Law Center as Immigration Secretary. Renamed @ShadowingDC in 2021, it had 68,000 followers by April 2021.

Personal life
Green has been married twice. His first marriage, to Lynn Heineman, whom he married while in law school, lasted 18 months. In 1977, Green married Deni Frand, who later became the director of the New York City office of the liberal interest group People for the American Way and a senior associate at AOL-Time Warner and the Citi Foundation. They have two adult children.

Selected publications
 Who Runs Congress? (co-authored with Michael Waldman; 1972)
 There he goes again: Ronald Reagan's reign of error, co-authored with Gail MacColl, with Robert Nelson & Christopher Power;  (1983)
 The Consumer Bible (co-authored with Nancy Youman; 1995)
 Selling Out: How Big Corporate Money Buys Elections, Rams through Legislation, and Betrays Our Democracy (2002);  
 The Book on Bush: How George W. Bush (Mis)leads America (co-authored with Eric Alterman; 2004); 
 Bright, Infinite Future: A Generational Memoir on the Progressive Rise (2016); 
Fake President – Decoding Trump's Gaslighting, Corruption, and General Bullsh*t (with Ralph Nader; 2019)

References

Further reading
Paterson, David Black, Blind, & In Charge: A Story of Visionary Leadership and Overcoming Adversity. New York, New York, 2020

External links

 Mark J. Green's response to the 2006 Attorney General screening questionnaire from the 504 Democratic Club of New York City

|-

|-

|-

1945 births
20th-century American Jews
21st-century American Jews
American book editors
American information and reference writers
American male non-fiction writers
American political writers
American talk radio hosts
Candidates in the 2001 United States elections
Consumer rights activists
Cornell University alumni
Harvard Law School alumni
Living people
New York (state) Democrats
New York City Public Advocates
People from Elmont, New York
People from Great Neck, New York
Politicians from New York City
Public Citizen
William A. Shine Great Neck South High School alumni